The Party of Progress and Socialism (PPS) is a left-wing socialist political party in Morocco.

History and profile
The party was founded in 1974 by Ali Yata as the successor of Moroccan Communist Party and Party of Liberation and Socialism.

After the fall of the Eastern Bloc, the party distanced itself from communism.

In the parliamentary election held  on 27 September 2002, the party won 11 out of 325 seats. In the next parliamentary election, held on 7 September 2007, the party won 17 out of 325 seats.

The PPS was included in the government of Prime Minister Abbas El Fassi, formed on 15 October 2007.

The party won 12 out of 325 seats in the parliamentary election held in 2016.

The PPS achieved its best result in the 2021 Moroccan general election winning 22 out of 395 seats and was able to form a parliamentary group for the first time in the party's history, despite the fact that party leader Nabil Benabdellah was defeated in the Rabat constituency.

Notable Members

Anas Doukkali : Minister of Health (2018-2019)
El Hossein El Ouardi : Minister of Health (2012-2017)
Nabil Benabdallah : Minister of Housing, Urbanism and Policy of the City (2012-2013), General Secretary of the Party of Progress and Socialism (2010-)
Abdelouahed Souhail : Minister of Employment and Vocational Training (2012-2013)

References

External links
Official website
PPS parliamentary group

1974 establishments in Morocco
Political parties established in 1974
Political parties in Morocco
Socialist parties in Morocco